The 45th annual Venice International Film Festival was held from 29 August to 9 September 1988.

Jury
The following people comprised the 1988 jury:
Sergio Leone (Head of Jury)
 María Julia Bertotto
 Klaus Eder
 Hannah Fischer
 Gilbert de Goldschmidt
 Adoor Gopalakrishnan
 Lena Olin
 Natalya Ryazantseva
 Harry Dean Stanton
 Lina Wertmüller

Official selection

In competition

Autonomous sections

Venice International Film Critics' Week
The following feature films were selected to be screened as In Competition for this section:
 The Kiss Of Judas (Il bacio di Giuda) by Paolo Benvenuti (Italy)
 The Gassy Sky (Der gläserne Himmel) by Nina Grosse (West Germany)
 Ghosts... of the Civil Dead by John Hillcoat (Australia)
 High Hopes by Mike Leigh (United Kingdom)
 Let's Get Lost by Bruce Weber (United States)
 Little Vera (Malenkaya Vera) by Vasili Pichul (Soviet Union)
 Mortu Nega (en. Death Denied or Those Whom Death Refused) by Flora Gomes  (Guinea-Bissau)
 Off Season (Nachsaison) by Wolfram Paulus (Austria, West Germany)

Awards

Golden Lion:The Legend of the Holy Drinker by Ermanno Olmi
Special Jury Prize:Camp de Thiaroye by Ousmane Sembene & Thierno Faty Sow
Silver Lion:Landscape in the Mist by Theodoros Angelopoulos
Golden Osella:
 Best Screenplay - Pedro Almodóvar (Women on the Verge of a Nervous Breakdown)
 Best Cinematography - Vadim Yusov (The Black Monk)
 Best Score - José María Vitier, Gianni Nocenzi, Pablo Milanés (A Very Old Man with Enormous Wings)
 Best Set Design  - Bernd Lepel (Burning Secret)
Volpi Cup:
 Best Actor - Joe Mantegna & Don Ameche (Things Change)
 Best Actress - Shirley MacLaine (Madame Sousatzka) & Isabelle Huppert (Story of Women)
Special Mention:
 David Eberts (Burning Secret)
The President of the Italian Senate's Gold Medal:Caro Gorbaciov by Carlo Lizzani
New Cinema AwardCamp de Thiaroye by Ousmane Sembene & Thierno Faty SowGli invisibili by Pasquale Squitieri
New Cinema Award - Special MentionUn petit monastère en Toscane by Otar Ioseliani
Career Golden Lion:
Joris Ivens
Prize of the Students of the University 'La Sapienza'Landscape in the Mist by Theodoros AngelopoulosGhosts... of the Civil Dead by John Hillcoat
Golden Ciak
Best Film - Story of Women by Claude Chabrol
Best Actor - Klaus Maria Brandauer (Burning Secret)
Best Actress - Carmen Maura (Women on the Verge of a Nervous Breakdown'')

References

External links

Venice Film Festival 1988 Awards on IMDb

1988 film festivals
Venice
Venice
Venice Film Festival
Film
August 1988 events in Europe
September 1988 events in Europe